Nervve was a visual search company located in Buffalo, New York, US. The company's main product allows users to search for a specific object, scene or event within media or video. They target their product for uses by media & entertainment, the US Department of Defense, the intelligence community, law enforcement, social media platforms and more. Nervve is a privately held company backed by investors that include HC2 Holdings Inc. and In-Q-Tel.

References

External links
 Nervve

Companies based in Buffalo, New York
Companies established in 2011